The 1906 North Dakota gubernatorial election, sometimes called 'The Revolution of 1906' was held on November 6, 1906. This election marked a major shift in North Dakota politics as the incumbent, Republican Elmore Sarles, was defeated by a 53.20% majority vote for Democrat John Burke, who had garnered bipartisan support across the state of constituents tired of Sarles' administration, which was supported by the Republican political machine run by politician Alexander McKenzie.

Background 
Incumbent Elmore Sarles had been a businessman prior to his election as the ninth governor of North Dakota in 1904, taking office in 1905. During his tenure in office, Sarles was frequently criticized for taking positions favoring big businesses, and for publicly drinking while the state constitution had enacted prohibition since its admission into the United States. Furthermore, Sarles was supported by a Republican political machine headed by Alexander McKenzie, who had been known for being a confidant of many top officials, and who had personally selected many candidates who later won state offices.

In the lead-up to the 1906 election, many newspapers began to publish articles and editorials railing against 'McKenzieism', and the Democrat candidate, John Burke, who had initially not wanted to run, used this as a campaign point, becoming very active, and winning over many Progressive Republicans who had been looking to oust the influence of McKenzie and Sarles.

General election results

Results by county

References

1906
North Dakota
Gubernatorial